Pseudoglessula acutissima is a species of small air-breathing land snail, a terrestrial pulmonate gastropod mollusk in the family  Achatinidae. This species is endemic to Tanzania.

References

Endemic fauna of Tanzania
Fauna of Tanzania
Pseudoglessula
Taxonomy articles created by Polbot